The 2002 Woking Council election took place on 2 May 2002 to elect members of Woking Borough Council in Surrey, England. One third of the council was up for election and the council stayed under no overall control. Overall turnout in the election was 33.28%, down from 34.32% in 2000.

After the election, the composition of the council was:
Conservative 17
Liberal Democrat 13
Labour 5
Independent 1

Election result

Ward results

References

2002
2002 English local elections
2000s in Surrey